Alella is a monotypic genus of copepods belonging to the family Lernaeopodidae. The only species, Alella pagelli, is found in Australia.

References

Siphonostomatoida
Copepod genera
Monotypic crustacean genera